Serruys is a surname. Notable people with the surname include:

 Paul Serruys (1912–1999), Belgian missionary, sinologist, and academic
 Yvonne Serruys (1873–1953), Franco-Belgian artist

Surnames of Belgian origin